Feed is the first book in the Newsflesh series of science fiction/horror novels written by Seanan McGuire under the pen name Mira Grant and published by Orbit Books in 2010. Set during the aftermath of a zombie apocalypse and written from the perspective of blog journalist Georgia Mason, Feed follows Georgia and her news team as they follow the  presidential campaign of Republican senator Peter Ryman. A series of deadly incidents leads Georgia and her brother Shaun to discover efforts to undermine the campaign, linked to a larger conspiracy involving the undead.

McGuire's interests in horror movies and virology inspired her to write the book, but she struggled with the plot until a friend suggested using an election as a framing device. The novel has been praised for its detailed worldbuilding, including the characters' awareness of previous zombie fiction—an element McGuire had found lacking in most horror works. Feed came second in the 2011 Hugo Award for Best Novel category. Deadline is the second book in the Newsflesh series. Just before the third installment, Blackout (May 22, 2012), was published, McGuire released an alternate ending to Feed.

Plot
Feed is set several decades after the zombie apocalypse, referred to as the Rising. Two man-made viruses (a cure for cancer and a cure for the common cold) combined to form Kellis-Amberlee, a virus that quickly infects all mammalian life. Kellis-Amberlee is normally benign, but the virus can "go live" or "amplify", converting any host mammal over  into a zombie. There are three mentioned ways amplification takes place: the death of the host, contact with a live specimen (being bitten by a zombie) and spontaneous conversion. Those infected that have not undergone amplification remain lucid until the virus has time to spread through the body. Lucidity is followed by lack of sensitivity to pain, memory loss and finally conversion.

Most humans reside in tightly controlled safe zones, with rigorous blood testing and decontamination protocols used to prevent the spread of the live K-A virus. After the inaction of traditional media during the Rising, blogs and other new media have taken over as the primary source of information and entertainment; bloggers are recognised as professional journalists, with individuals specialising and identifying as "Newsies" (objective, fact-based reporters), "Stewarts" ("who report opinion informed by fact"), "Irwins" (named after Steve Irwin, who seek to educate and entertain by going out and "poking things with sticks"), "Aunties" (who share personal stories, recipes, and other content "to keep people happy and relaxed"), or "Fictionals" (fictional content and poetry creators).

Feed occurs in 2040 and is written from the perspective of Georgia "George" Mason, a Newsie blogger and head of the After the End Times website. Georgia, her brother Shaun (an Irwin), and their friend Georgette "Buffy" Meissonier (a Fictional and a technology guru), are selected to cover the presidential campaign of Senator Peter Ryman, a moderate Republican. The campaign is mostly uneventful until it reaches Eakly, Oklahoma, where zombies attack the campaign convoy, killing several before security (assisted by Georgia and Shaun) can contain them; they later discover it was an orchestrated attack. The next stage of the campaign is the Republican National Convention, where Ryman faces off against religious, right-wing Governor David Tate and sex-over-substance Congresswoman Kristen Wagman. During the convention, Rick Cousins (a Newsie and former print journalist) defects from Wagman's campaign to join After the End Times. Ryman is selected as the Republican presidential candidate, but as this is announced, Georgia learns that a zombie outbreak occurred at the senator's horse ranch, and his eldest daughter is dead. Georgia and company investigate and find that the outbreak started from a horse injected with the live virus.

Ryman and the campaign relocate to Texas, where Ryman joins his vice-presidential candidate: Tate. The bloggers must drive their vehicles and equipment overland. During the trip, the journalists' convoy (which has become separated from that part of the presidential entourage that drove ahead of them) is attacked by a sniper. Georgia, Shaun, and Rick survive, but the van carrying Buffy and Chuck (Buffy's beau) crashes. Chuck dies, zombifies, and bites Buffy. She confesses to leaking information to a group undermining Ryman's campaign; the attack occurred because she had refused to continue. After administering a coup de grâce, Georgia calls for rescue, but the Centers for Disease Control (CDC) team drugs the surviving group members and takes them for testing. After being released, the team's work on the campaign is hampered as they dig into the underlying conspiracy, souring the bloggers' relationship with Ryman and Tate. The team finds evidence linking Tate to the attacks, along with hints of a broader conspiracy involving the CDC and other parties, but when Georgia confronts Ryman during an event in Sacramento, California, he is skeptical and sends them away to prepare to convince him with facts, otherwise he will fire them from the campaign. As the bloggers leave, they are attacked, and Georgia is shot with a tranquiliser dart containing the live virus. Rick escapes with a copy of the group's evidence just before a zombie outbreak is instigated, and Shaun helps Georgia expose the conspiracy through one last blog post. She then begins amplifying, forcing Shaun to execute her.

The novel's narration then changes to Shaun's perspective. He rallies Ryman's security detail to help contain the outbreak, then breaks into the convention centre to confront Ryman and Tate. Tate takes Ryman's wife hostage with a syringe of the zombie virus, claiming his actions were part of a plot using fear of the zombies to reshape America into a more faith-based society. Then the governor injects himself instead, and Shaun shoots him to prevent zombification.

Background
The inspiration to write Feed came from the combination of McGuire's interests in horror movies and virology. McGuire wanted a zombie virus that was society-changing but survivable, and spent two years developing the concepts of the virus and its consequences. Another aspect McGuire wanted to tackle was the apparent lack of awareness horror fiction characters had of horror fiction canon: in her novel, movies like Dawn of the Dead (1978) are credited with helping the human race survive.

Despite establishing the above-mentioned background, McGuire struggled with the plot until a friend suggested using a presidential campaign as a framing device. This allowed McGuire to explore a large cross-section of issues and demonstrate the life-changing result of the zombie apocalypse.

Reception
Zack Handlen's review of the novel for The A.V. Club describes Feed as "The West Wing by way of George Romero". He singles out the level of detail in McGuire's worldbuilding for praise, and he observes that although most of the cast are stock characters, this is not a major obstacle in enjoying the book's narrative.

Writing for Strange Horizons, Jonathan McCalmont praised Feed as a "delight", highlighting its overall structure, well written action and dialogue, and detailed worldbuilding. However, McCalmont found it hard to take the book at face value as a political thriller, and chose to interpret it as a merciless satire of contemporary journalism and the issues associated with it.

The fact that Feed and its characters acknowledge previous zombie fiction is praised by Schlock Mercenary webcartoonist Howard Tayler.

Feed was listed as number 74 in NPR's 2010 "Top 100 Killer Thrillers" poll. The novel was nominated for the 2011 Hugo Award for Best Novel, and came second in that category, behind Blackout/All Clear (2010) by Connie Willis.

Alternate ending
Shortly before the 22 May release of Blackout (2012), McGuire released an alternate ending to Feed, titled Fed. The ending was initially made available on Facebook on 17 May, then released online by Orbit on 23 May.

The new ending starts shortly after Ryman kicks Georgia, Shaun, and Rick out of the Sacramento event, and diverges with the virus dart hitting Shaun instead of Georgia. Georgia and Rick retreat inside the van to post their findings on Tate and the conspiracy, while Shaun dies defending them from the outbreak. Georgia confronts and kills Tate, then commits suicide a week later, unable to live in a world without Shaun. The perspective changes to Rick's, broken and alcoholic, as he organizes the Masons' funerals. He notes that the conspiracy may not have ended with Tate, but "someone else was going to have to save the world next time."

References

Novels by Seanan McGuire
2010 American novels
American zombie novels
Orbit Books books